Coleophora raptans is a moth of the family Coleophoridae. It is found in Afghanistan.

The wingspan is about 14 mm. The forewings are white with brown scales concentrated at the margin, the apex and in the cell. The hindwings are pearly grey.

References

Moths described in 1989
raptans
Moths of Asia